Eyshabad (also Romanized as ‘Eyshābād) is a village in Golmakan Rural District, Golbajar District, Chenaran County, Razavi Khorasan Province, Iran. At the 2006 census, its population was 290, in 76 families.

References 

Populated places in Chenaran County